Jayant Prabhakar Patil is an Indian politician. He is currently the General Secretary of Peasants and Workers Party of India and a Member of the Legislative Council of Maharashtra. He is Chairman of Raigad District Central Co-operative Bank.

Political career
After the death of his father he became leader of his party.

The 2004 Maharashtra Assembly Election was a major setback for his party, as two of the Major leaders lost their seats from Alibag and Pen Constituency. In 2009 they regained those constituency seats, but lost Panvel and also lost a number of votes from district. In the 2014 election they only won two seats in Raigad.

In 2019, they allied with NCP and lost all the seats in Raigad.

References

Peasants and Workers Party of India politicians
Marathi politicians
Maharashtra politicians
Living people
Year of birth missing (living people)